SOKO Potsdam is a German police procedural television series that premiered on 24 September 2018 on ZDF. It is the ninth offshoot of SOKO München, launched in 1978. "SOKO" is an abbreviation of the German word Sonderkommission, which means "special investigative team". The show revolves around a police team that investigates murders and other serious crimes in the city of Potsdam and surrounding areas.

Cast and characters
Current

Former

See also
 List of German television series

References

External links
 
 SOKO Potsdam on ZDF
 Bantry Bay productions

2018 German television series debuts
German crime television series
2010s German police procedural television series
2020s German police procedural television series
German television spin-offs
German-language television shows
ZDF original programming